Abdelmalek Cherrad (born 14 January 1981) is a former professional footballer who played as a forward. Born in France, he made 18 appearances for the Algeria national team, scoring 7 goals.

Club career
Born in La Tronche, France, Cherrad began his playing career with OGC Nice in 1998. His first full season as a professional saw him make five appearances. His six and a half seasons with Nice saw him loaned out to several different sides in France and abroad. He played for the likes of AS Cannes, Espérance de Tunis, K.A.A. Gent and SC Bastia. His spell with Bastia, saw Bastia sign him in January 2005. His two and a half seasons with Bastia, saw him make twenty one appearances, scoring seven goals.

In the summer of 2007, Bastia released Cherrad. In November 2007, he signed for Algerian side MC Alger. He remained with the Algerian side for one season where in 2008 he returned to Bastia. He returned to the Les Bleus on a one-year deal. His second spell with Bastia saw him make fourteen appearances, scoring two goals.

Cherrad left Bastia in summer 2009 for newly promoted to Ligue 2 side AC Arles-Avignon. His stay was short-lived as he was released at the end of 2009. In the January transfer window he moved to Portugal to play for Maritimo. In January 2011, he was on the move again this time representing Belenenses for the latter half of the 2010–11 season. In the summer of 2011, Maritimo would release Cherrad.

In October 2012, Cherrad signed for Grenoble Foot 38.

International career
Cherrad was part of the Algeria national team at the 2004 African Nations Cup which finished second in its group in the first round of competition before being defeated by Morocco in the quarter-finals. Cherrad has 18 caps and 7 goals with Algeria.

Career statistics
Scores and results list Algeria's goal tally first, score column indicates score after each Cherrad goal.

References

External links
 
 
 

1981 births
Living people
Sportspeople from La Tronche
French sportspeople of Algerian descent
Association football forwards
Algerian footballers
Algeria international footballers
2004 African Cup of Nations players
Ligue 1 players
Ligue 2 players
OGC Nice players
AS Cannes players
Espérance Sportive de Tunis players
Belgian Pro League players
K.A.A. Gent players
SC Bastia players
Algerian Ligue Professionnelle 1 players
MC Alger players
AC Arlésien players
Primeira Liga players
C.S. Marítimo players
C.F. Os Belenenses players
Grenoble Foot 38 players
Algerian expatriate footballers
Expatriate footballers in Tunisia
French expatriate sportspeople in Tunisia
Algerian expatriate sportspeople in Tunisia
Expatriate footballers in Belgium
French expatriate sportspeople in Belgium
Algerian expatriate sportspeople in Belgium
Expatriate footballers in Portugal
French expatriate sportspeople in Portugal
Algerian expatriate sportspeople in Portugal
Footballers from Auvergne-Rhône-Alpes
French footballers